The 2018 Russian Women's Football Championship was the 27th season of the Russian women's football top level league. Zvezda-2005 Perm were the defending champions.

Teams

League table

Results

Top scorers

Hat-tricks

References 

2018
Rus
Rus
Wom
Wom